Andrew Nicholas Rollings (born 14 December 1954) is an English retired professional footballer, best remembered for his six years as a centre back in the Football League with Brighton & Hove Albion. He also played League football for Portsmouth, Swindon Town, Norwich City, Torquay United and Brentford.

Personal life 
In the mid-1980s, Rollings opened the Chalet Cafe in Preston Park, Brighton, with his wife, Judy. As of October 2019, he was still running the cafe.

Career statistics

Honours 
Brighton & Hove Albion
 Football League Second Division second-place promotion: 1978–79
 Football League Third Division second-place promotion: 1976–77
Portsmouth
 Football League Third Division: 1982–83

References

1954 births
English footballers
English Football League players
Brentford F.C. players
Living people
People from Portishead, Somerset
Association football central defenders
Norwich City F.C. players
Brighton & Hove Albion F.C. players
Swindon Town F.C. players
Portsmouth F.C. players
Torquay United F.C. players
Maidstone United F.C. (1897) players
Gorleston F.C. players
National League (English football) players